The 2021 FC Aktobe season was Aktobe's 1st season back in the Kazakhstan Premier League, the highest tier of association football in Kazakhstan, following their relegation from the league in 2019.

Season events
On 6 January, Aktobe announced the signings of Yerkebulan Nurgaliyev, Yury Pertsukh and Didar Zhalmukan.

On 7 January, Aktobe announced the signing of Bojan Dubajić. The following day, 8 January, Hervaine Moukam also joined Aktobe from BATE Borisov.

On 18 February, Aktobe announced the signings of Igor Sergeyev and Tongo Doumbia.

On 27 February, Aktobe announced the signings of Dinmukhamed Kashken, Lasha Totadze, Armen Manucharyan, Michal Jeřábek and Maxim Fedin.

On 10 March, Aktobe where deducted 3 points due to the unavailability of their nominated reserve stadium for their second match-day fixture. On 12 April, Aktobe had these 3 points reinstated after their stadium passed its next inspection and was deemed up to the required standard.

On 14 April, Aktobe announced the signing of Artūras Žulpa and Sergei Revyakin, whilst Esen Zhasanov joined Ekibastuz on loan.

On 5 May, Alyaksey Baha resigned as Head Coach of Aktobe, with Vladimir Zelenovskiy being placed in temporary charge. Later the same day, Aktobe announced the signing of Yury Logvinenko on a free transfer, after he'd left Rotor Volgograd in March 2021.

On 7 June, Vakhid Masudov was announced as Aktobes new Head Coach.

On 9 June, Aktobe announced the signing of Igor Gubanov on a free transfer, after he'd played for Kyzylzhar the previous season.

On 23 June, Aktobe announced that Armen Manucharyan and Lasha Totadze had left the club mutual consent.

On 2 July, Aktobe announced the signing of Dmitry Shomko from Rotor Volgograd.

On 3 July, Vitali Volkov left Aktobe.

On 8 July, Aktobe announced the signing of Zaza Tsitskishvili from Telavi.

On 11 July, Bojan Dubajić left Aktobe.

On 13 July, Aktobe announced the signing of Ramazan Orazov.

On 14 July, Aktobe announced the signing of Temirlan Yerlanov from Ordabasy, and the departure of Igor Gubanov.

On 19 July, Igor Sergeyev left Aktobe to sign for Tobol.

On 26 July, Vakhid Masudov left his role as Head Coach by mutual consent.

On 4 August, Vladimir Mukhanov was appointed as Head Coach of Aktobe for the second time.

On 7 August, Aktobe announced the signing of Nikita Laktionov from Rodina Moscow and Ihar Zyankovich from Minsk.

On 26 August, Aktobe announced the signing of Dmytro Korkishko from Chornomorets Odesa. The following day, 27 August, Vitaliy Balashov signed for Aktobe having left Shakhter Karagandy in June, whilst Joachim Adukor joined on 30 August from Sarajevo.

Squad

Out on loan

Transfers

In

Out

Loans out

Released

Friendlies

Competitions

Overview

Premier League

Results summary

Results by round

Results

League table

Kazakhstan Cup

Group stage

Squad statistics

Appearances and goals

|-
|colspan="16"|Players away from Aktobe on loan:
|-
|colspan="16"|Players who left Aktobe during the season:

|}

Goal scorers

Clean sheets

Disciplinary record

References

External links

FC Aktobe seasons
Aktobe